Steve Mould (born 5 October 1978) is a British educational YouTuber, author, and science presenter who is most notable for making science-related educational videos on his YouTube channel.

Early life 

Mould was born on 5 October 1978 in Gateshead, United Kingdom. He went to St Thomas More Catholic School, Blaydon, before going on to study physics at St Hugh's College, Oxford.

Career 
In 2014, Mould co-hosted ITV's I Never Knew That About Britain alongside Paul Martin and Suzannah Lipscomb. He has also appeared as a science expert on The Alan Titchmarsh Show, The One Show, and Blue Peter.

 Mould's YouTube video on rising self-siphoning beads, in which he demonstrated the phenomenon and proposed an explanation, brought the problem to the attention of academics John Biggins and Mark Warner of Cambridge University, who published their findings about what has now been called the "chain fountain" in Proceedings of the Royal Society A. 

Between 2008 and 2010, Mould performed three geeky sketch shows at the Edinburgh Festival Fringe with Gemma Arrowsmith. Since 2011, Steve has performed live science comedy as part of the comedic trio Festival of the Spoken Nerd, with mathematician Matt Parker and physicist songstress Helen Arney. Festival of the Spoken Nerd has performed at theatres as well as science and arts festivals.

Personal life
Mould lives in London with his wife Lianne, who is a linguist, and their children.

References

External links 
 
 Steve Mould's YouTube channel
 Festival of the Spoken Nerd

1978 births
Living people
People from Gateshead
English YouTubers
Mathematics popularizers
Science communicators
Educational and science YouTubers
Science-related YouTube channels